is a Japanese light novel series written by Nisio Isin and illustrated by Vofan. The plot centers on Koyomi Araragi, a third-year high school student who survives a vampire attack and finds himself helping girls involved with a variety of apparitions, ghosts, beasts, spirits, and other supernatural phenomena, which often serve as proxies for their emotional and mental issues. Between November 2006 and August 2021, Kodansha published 28 volumes in the series under its Kodansha Box imprint. All of the series' story arcs share the common title suffix .

Shaft has animated the Monogatari series multiple times since 2009. The first season of the anime adaptation consists of 30 episodes, which were broadcast in Japan between July 2009 and December 2012. The second season consists of 28 episodes broadcast between July and December 2013, and the third and final season consists of 42 episodes broadcast between December 2014 and June 2019. A prequel anime film trilogy, Kizumonogatari, was released in 2016 and 2017. A manga adaptation, illustrated by Oh! great and titled  Bakemonogatari, began serialization in Kodansha's Weekly Shōnen Magazine in March 2018.

Synopsis

Setting
Most heroines have an item that symbolises their spectres, such as Hitagi's stapler (the claw of a crab), Mayoi's backpack (the shell of a snail), Suruga's arm (the arm of a monkey), Nadeko's hat and jacket (the head and skin of a snake), and Karen's black and yellow tracksuit (the colors of a bee). Although it incorporates elements of fantasy, horror, and action, the series primarily focuses on relationships and conversations between its characters, which make heavy use of Nisio Isin's signature word play and metahumor.

Premise

The Monogatari series revolves around Koyomi Araragi, a third-year high school student who has almost restored his humanity after briefly becoming a vampire during spring break. One day, a classmate of his, the reclusive Hitagi Senjōgahara, falls down a flight of stairs at school into Koyomi's arms. To his surprise, he discovers that Hitagi weighs almost nothing, in defiance of physics. Despite being threatened to keep away, Koyomi offers his help and introduces her to Meme Oshino, a strange middle-aged man living in an abandoned cram school who helped reverse his vampirism. Once Koyomi helps solve Hitagi's problem, she decides to become his girlfriend.

As the series progresses, Koyomi finds himself involved with other girls afflicted by : a child named Mayoi Hachikuji; his underclassman Suruga Kanbaru; Nadeko Sengoku, a friend of his sisters; his classmate Tsubasa Hanekawa; and his own younger sisters Karen and Tsukihi. To deal with the apparitions, which feed on human emotions and often take forms symbolically represented by animals, Koyomi relies on supernatural guidance from Oshino and, later, from Shinobu, the once-powerful blonde vampire who attacked him and later assumed the appearance of an eight-year-old girl.

Production
As Nisio Isin's previous work, the Zaregoto series, had been accepted as a light novel, he decided to write the first Monogatari short story, "Hitagi Crab", with a more formal approach in mind. It was not a simple transition from light novels to formal literature, but rather an experiment to see if he could write a light novel without illustrations. However, by the series' third story, "Suruga Monkey", it was decided that illustrations would be included in publication, and he changed his approach accordingly. He has stated that the atmosphere between Kizumonogatari and Nisemonogatari differed due to his knowledge that the latter would be adapted as an anime.

Media

Light novels

The Monogatari series was first written by Nisio Isin as a series of short stories without illustrations for Kodansha's literary magazine Mephisto. The first three stories were printed in the magazine's September 2005, January 2006, and May 2006 issues, respectively; they were later collected in a light novel volume entitled  on November 2, 2006. A second volume of Bakemonogatari, containing two new chapters, was released in December 2006. Both volumes were published under the Kodansha Box imprint and featured original art by Taiwanese illustrator Vofan, who would illustrate all following releases.

A prequel story to Bakemonogatari entitled  was published in the February 2008 issue of Pandora magazine. It was later released as a light novel volume entitled  in May 2008. The next story arc, was released as two volumes in September 2008 and June 2009.

The second Monogatari saga, referred to as the "Second Season", released between 2010 and 2011, delves further into Koyomi's relationship with each of the heroines. The second volume of Nekomonogatari, subtitled , was released in October 2010.

The third Monogatari saga, referred to as the "Final Season", released between 2012 and 2014, deepens the history of the character Ōgi Oshino, a supposed relative of Meme Oshino.

The fourth Monogatari saga, referred to as "Off Season", released between 2015 and 2017, contains side stories focusing on various characters.

The fifth Monogatari saga, referred to as "Monster Season", released between 2017 and 2021, follows Koyomi's life as a university student.

In 2015, Vertical licensed the novel series for English release. The company began its paperback line with Kizumonogatari on December 15, 2015, and later released the Bakemonogatari novels in three volumes: the first in December 2016, the second in February 2017, and the third in April 2017. As of December 2020, the novels in the series up to Zoku Owarimonogatari have been translated.

The English audiobook version of Kizumonogatari was released on May 25, 2016 by Bang Zoom! Entertainment with narration done by Keith Silverstein, Eric Kimerer, and Cristina Vee. The audiobook for Nekomonogatari (White) was released on April 9, 2019 with narration done by Cristina Vee, Eric Kimerer, and Erica Mendez. The audiobook for the three volumes of Bakemonogatari were released on March 24, 2020 with narration done by Eric Kimerer, Cristina Vee, Erica Mendez, and Keith Silverstein.

The Japanese audiobook version of the entire series began release by Kodansha via Audible in February 17, 2021. Each novel features narration by the voice actors/actresses of the anime adaptation. It will be released one novel each month until June 16, 2023 with the second volume of Shinomonogatari.

Anime

An anime adaptation of Bakemonogatari was announced in April 2008, and broadcast between July 3 and September 25, 2009 on Tokyo MX. The 15-episode series was animated by Shaft and directed by Akiyuki Shinbo and series director Tatsuya Oishi, with series composition by Shinbo and Shaft staff under the collective pen name of Fuyashi Tō, character designs by Akio Watanabe based on Vofan's original concepts, and scripts edited by Yukito Kizawa and Muneo Nakamoto. The music for the series was composed by Satoru Kōsaki. Only the first 12 episodes were broadcast on television; the remaining three episodes were distributed on the anime's website between November 3, 2009 and June 25, 2010. At Sakura-Con 2012, Aniplex of America announced that it had acquired Bakemonogatari for release in North America. All 15 episodes were released on Blu-ray with English subtitles on November 20, 2012.

An 11-episode anime adaptation of Nisemonogatari aired from January 8 to March 18, 2012, produced by the same staff as Bakemonogatari, but with Tomoyuki Itamura replacing Tatsuya Oishi as director. A four-episode anime television series adaptation of  aired back-to-back on December 31, 2012. Two Blu-ray and DVD compilation volumes were released: the first on March 6, 2013 and the second on April 3, 2013. Aniplex USA later released the Blu-ray on April 22, and June 24, 2014. Kabukimonogatari and Onimonogatari featured Naoyuki Tatsuwa and Yuki Yase as series directors for those respective arcs under Itamura and Shinbo. Five episodes of Monogatari Second Season, adapting the Hanamonogatari story arc from the novels, were delayed from the original broadcast due to production issues and aired as a marathon on August 16, 2014,

A four-episode adaptation of the first novel of the third series, Tsukimonogatari, aired in a marathon on December 31, 2014. A 13-episode anime television series adapting two more novels of the third series, titled Owarimonogatari, aired between October 3 and December 19, 2015. A series of three films adapting the prequel novel Kizumonogatari were produced, with the first one, Kizumonogatari Part 1: Tekketsu, premiering on January 8, 2016, the second film, Kizumonogatari Part 2: Nekketsu, premiering on August 19, 2016, and the third and final film, Kizumonogatari Part 3: Reiketsu, premiering on January 6, 2017. A web anime series adapting Koyomimonogatari became available for download on the App Store and Google Play from January 9, 2016. A seven-episode anime television series, an adaptation of the third Owarimonogatari novel, aired on August 12 and 13, 2017. An adaptation of Zoku Owarimonogatari was released in theaters on November 10, 2018 and as two Blu-ray and DVD volumes on February 27, 2019 and March 27, 2019. It aired on TV as six episodes between May 18 and June 22, 2019.

The anime adaptation does not follow the order of the novels. Kizumonogatari was planned to be released in 2012 after Bakemonogatari, but due to production issues, it was delayed until 2016. Hanamonogatari was originally planned to be animated in its original place from the novels, but it got postponed to air after Monogatari Series Second Season. In the Blu-ray box set of Monogatari Series Second Season though, Hanamonogatari is listed as the third arc. Koyomimonogatari in the novels was released before Owarimonogatari, but in the anime adaptation, it was released on the App Store and Google Play app after Kizumonogatari I and Owarimonogatari.

Music
The several opening themes were written by Meg Rock and composed by Satoru Kōsaki and Mito, featuring vocals of the main characters. The ending theme for Bakemonogatari, was produced by Supercell and released on August 12, 2009 featuring vocals Nagi Yanagi, and peaked at No. 5 in the Oricon singles charts. The ending theme for Nisemonogatari is  sung by ClariS and written by Ryo of Supercell. For Monogatari Series Third and Final Season, it features five ending songs: "Border" by ClariS for Tsukimonogatari,  by Alisa Takigawa for the first season of Owarimonogatari, "whiz" by TrySail for Koyomimonogatari, "Shiori" by ClariS for the second season of Owarimonogatari, and "azure" by TrySail for Zoku Owarimonogatari.

Utamonogatari
The collection of theme songs, released on January 6, 2016, ranked at No. 1 on Oricon's weekly album chart at the time selling over 66,000 copies. It was the fifth anime theme song collection to top the Oricon's weekly album chart since 2010's One Piece Memorial Best album. It also sold over 100,000 copies and was certified as a Gold Disc by Japan Record Association. Disc 1 feature the opening and ending themes for Monogatari First Season: Bakemonogatari, Nisemonogatari, and Nekomonogatari (Black). Disc 2 feature the opening and ending themes for Monogatari Second Season: Nekomonogatari (White), Kabukimonogatari, Hanamonogatari, Otorimonogatari, Onimonogatari, and Koimonogatari.

Utamonogatari 2
The second collection of theme songs, released on May 10, 2019, sold over 16,000 copies in its first week and was ranked at No. 1 on Oricon's weekly album chart. It feature the opening and ending themes of Monogatari Final Season: Tsukimonogatari, Owarimonogatari I and II, and Zoku Owarimonogatari. It also feature the ending theme of Koyomimonogatari,  the two ending themes of the Kizumonogatari'''s trilogy and the opening theme for the mobile game PucPuc.

Manga

A manga adaptation of the series, illustrated by Oh! great, started in Kodansha's magazine Weekly Shōnen Magazine on March 14, 2018. Vertical began releasing the manga in North America in October 2019.

Other media
A drama CD titled , a reference to the parlor game Hyakumonogatari Kaidankai, was released on August 3, 2009. The script was written by Nisio Isin and is bundled with the CD. A PlayStation Portable visual novel titled  developed by Bandai Namco Games was released on August 23, 2012.

Good Smile Company has made several nendoroid petit figures for the series, releasing them as separate sets. The first set contains the characters Koyomi Araragi, Hitagi Senjōgahara and Tsubasa Hanekawa. The second set contains Suruga Kanbaru, Mayoi Hachikuji and Nadeko Sengoku and the third set contains the Araragi sisters Karen and Tsukihi, as well as Shinobu Oshino. 
The company also made a line of separate, 1/8 scale figures of Hitagi Senjōgahara, 
Suruga Kanbaru, 
Nadeko Sengoku, 
Tsubasa Hanekawa, 
Mayoi Hachikuji, 
Karen Araragi, 
Tsukihi Araragi, 
Shinobu Oshino, 
Kiss-Shot Acerola-Orion Heart-Under-Blade (from Kizumonogatari), 
Nadeko Sengoku in her Medusa form, 
and Yotsugi Ononoki. 
They have also made figma figures of several of the characters: Koyomi Araragi, 
Hitagi Senjōgahara, 
Mayoi Hachikuji, 
Suruga Kanbaru, 
Nadeko Sengoku, 
and Tsubasa Hanekawa. They have planned to make the Araragi sisters, Karen and Tsukihi. Alter, Bandai, Kotobukiya, and others have made figures of some of the other characters as well.

Reception
The light novel series ranked sixth in the 2009 issue of the light novel guidebook Kono Light Novel ga Sugoi! published by Takarajimasha. It later went on to rank as high as second in 2010, and 2017 issue, with the latter in the tankōbon category. In the 2019 issue, in the tankōbon category, the series ranked third. In the 2020 issue it was revealed the top 10 light novels of the past decade, and the series ranked in the 10th place. Koyomi Araragi ranked sixth in the Best Male Character in 2009, second in 2010, seventh in 2011, third in 2012, and sixth in 2013. Meanwhile, Hitagi Senjōgahara ranked seventh in the Best Female Character in 2009, fourth in 2010, eighth in 2011, and seventh in 2012.

The anime adaptation won the Users' Special Award in the 2nd annual DEG Japan Awards/Blu-ray Prizes. Over one million DVDs and BDs of Bakemonogatari and Nisemonogatari have been sold combined as of September 2012. Across its 27 volumes, the series has sold over two million DVDs and BDs as of October 2015. The Tokyo Anime Award held in 2017 selected Bakemonogatari as the best anime released in 2009.

According to Comic Book Resources, the series is "one of the most interesting and unusual series" to come out in the 2010s and praised the series for standing out "from other supernatural vampire series in the anime space." CBR'' further said that the characters, the music, dialogue, experimentation, and animation, have aged well, while the interactions between Koyomi and the children, Suruga Kanbaru as a lesbian, women needing to be saved by a man, its resemblance of harem anime, and fan service have not.

References

Notes

Citations

External links
 Bakemonogatari at Kodansha Box 
 Monogatari Series anime official website 
 Monogatari Series Second Season at Aniplex USA
 Bakemonogatari Portable official website 
 

Monogatari
2005 Japanese novels
2009 anime television series debuts
2009 anime ONAs
2012 anime television series debuts
2012 video games
2013 anime television series debuts
2015 anime television series debuts
Anime and manga based on light novels
Aniplex franchises
Fiction with unreliable narrators
Japan-exclusive video games
Kodansha books
Light novels
Mystery anime and manga
Supernatural anime and manga
Psychological anime and manga
PlayStation Portable games
PlayStation Portable-only games
Shaft (company)
Vampires in anime and manga
Vertical (publisher) titles
Video games developed in Japan
Visual novels
Nisio Isin
Works published under a pseudonym